The second season of the American television comedy-drama series Devious Maids began airing on Lifetime on April 20, 2014. The season consists of 13 episodes.

Plot
The second season premiered on April 20, 2014. The season centers on the mystery story of Opal, the new, 40-something maid, played by Joanna P. Adler. The character is described as "reminiscent of Mrs. Danvers from Hitchcock's Rebecca" and is seen as a threat to Marisol's new relationship with Nicholas. The second season also deals with Rosie working for an African-American family that is scheming to do harm to an elderly man she's hired to act as a caregiver, Zoila dealing with her estrangement from her husband Pablo while her daughter Valentina tries to distance herself from Remi and Zoila while trying to downplay the attention of pool boy Ethan, both of whom, along with a new body guard, Tony, are hired by Adrian and Evelyn Powell in the wake of a series of robberies that leads to deadly consequences for Alejandro, who is killed during their heist at his party, leaving Carmen, who signed a deal to insure a recording deal in order to keep his homosexuality a secret, back to square one in her quest to become famous.

Casting
For the second season, four new series regular actors were added for the show.  Brianna Brown, Wolé Parks and Brett Cullen did not return for season 2. Mariana Klaveno went from regular to recurring basis in second season. Stage actress Joanna P. Adler was cast in main role of a new mystery maid, Opal, in December 2013. Newcomer Dominic Adams was cast as Tony, the bodyguard. Tricia O'Kelley joined the cast in the recurring role as Tanya. Colin Woodell was cast as his son, Ethan Sinclair, and Mark Deklin as Nicholas Deering, Marisol's new love interest.

This season, Klaveno, Brown, Cullen and Parks left as show regular performers. Klaveno, Cedeño and Hamilton returned as recurring status. Academy Award–nominee June Squibb also was cast as Susan Lucci's character's mother, Velma, in two episodes of the second season. Also was added the African-American Family - the Millers, Tiffany Hines as Didi, Kimberly Hebert Gregory as Lucinda, Reggie Austin as Reggie, and Willie C. Carpenter as Kenneth Miller.

Cast

Main
 Ana Ortiz as Marisol Suarez/Deering
 Dania Ramirez as Rosie Falta 
 Roselyn Sánchez as Carmen Luna 
 Judy Reyes as Zoila Diaz 
 Edy Ganem as Valentina Diaz 
 Rebecca Wisocky as Evelyn Powell 
 Tom Irwin as Adrian Powell 
 Grant Show as Spencer Westmore 
 Drew Van Acker as Remi Delatour 
 Susan Lucci as Genevieve Delatour 
 Mark Deklin as Nicholas Deering 
 Joanna P. Adler as Opal Sinclair 
 Dominic Adams as Tony Bishara / Amir Hassan 
 Colin Woodell as Ethan Sinclair

Recurring
 Reggie Austin as Reggie Miller 
 Willie C. Carpenter as Kenneth Miller 
 Gideon Glick as Ty McKay 
Octavio Westwood as Miguel Falta
 Tiffany Hines as Didi Miller
Ivan Hernandez as Javier Mendoza
 Kimberly Hebert Gregory as Lucinda Miller 
 Alex Fernandez as Pablo Diaz
Susie Abromeit as Dahlia Deering 
 Matt Cedeño as Alejandro Rubio
 Melinda Page Hamilton as Odessa Burakov
 Tricia O'Kelley as Tanya Taseltof

Guest
 Mariana Klaveno as Peri Westmore 
 June Squibb as Velma Mudge 
 Deke Anderson as Rick Dresden
 Michael Feinstein as himself
 E. Roger Mitchell as Detective Figueroa
 Brianna Brown as Taylor Stappord 
 Sean Flynn as Jason

Episodes

Ratings

U.S. ratings

References

External links
 
 
 
 

Devious Maids 
2014 American television seasons